George Milton Holmes (June 20, 1929 – December 31, 2009) was a  Republican member of the North Carolina General Assembly representing the state's 92nd House district, including constituents in eastern Surry, northern Iredell and Yadkin counties.  A retiree from Hamptonville, North Carolina, Holmes began serving his sixteenth term in January 2007. He was one of the longest serving North Carolina legislators. He died on December 31, 2009, in Winston-Salem, North Carolina.

Early life
Holmes, a native of Mount Airy, North Carolina, was a 1954 graduate of Appalachian State University. At Appalachian, he received a football scholarship. Holmes married Barbara Ireland, the daughter of William Nelson Ireland, who was also a state legislator in the 1950s.

He taught at West Yadkin High School from 1954–1956, coaching football, baseball and basketball. In 1956, he joined W. N. Ireland Insurance Company in Yadkinville, North Carolina. He later became president and co-owner.

Political life
Holmes was first elected to state office in 1974 and has only been defeated once, in the post-Watergate backlash against Republicans in 1976. He was the minority whip from 1981–1982 and minority party joint caucus leader from 1983-84. When Republicans took over the state House in 1995, Holmes gained considerable power as the co-chairman of the House Appropriations Committee from 1995-98.

In 2003, Holmes, the senior Republican, was a candidate for speaker of the state House. Holmes was a compromise candidate after five Republicans refused to support Rep. Leo Daughtry. Republican Rep. Richard T. Morgan ended Holmes' bid when he and his allies orchestrated a power-sharing deal with Democrat Jim Black.

The George M. Holmes Convocation Center, an 8,325 seat arena in Boone, North Carolina, is named for Holmes, who was instrumental in bringing in state funds for the project.

Holmes was popular in his district, which is overwhelmingly Republican. He ran unopposed in the 2006 and 2004 elections, and had a Libertarian challenger in 2002.

Campaign finance questions
In December 2006, Holmes was criticized after it was reported he wrote three checks to himself totaling more than $79,000 from his campaign finance account. The last payment from the account was four days before a new law limiting personal use of campaign money took effect.

Holmes defended the transfer, saying what he did was within the law.

"Through 32 years of serving in the General Assembly, I accumulated more than I had to spend for my campaign," Holmes told the Winston-Salem Journal. "I see nothing wrong with a person who has accumulated excess funds through the years using that money because it was given with no strings attached."

Recent news
In the 2007-08 session of the legislature, Holmes was a member of these committees: Appropriations, Aging, Election Law and Campaign Finance Reform, Financial Institutions, Judiciary, Public Utilities, and University Board of Governors Nominating. He also is vice-chairman of the Appropriations Subcommittee on Transportation.

Holmes was hospitalized in March 2007 for pneumonia and to receive some treatment for his heart. He was back at his desk by March 26, 2007.

In 2008, Holmes cited his health when he declined to run for a 17th term.

Awards
Appalachian State University Distinguished Alumni Award, 1995
N.C. Senior Tarheel Legislative Award for Exemplary Leadership, 1996
Order of the Long Leaf Pine, 1992
Yadkin County Chamber of Commerce Public Service Award, 1993
 The Veterans of Foreign Wars Exemplary Service award, 1995

References

External links
North Carolina General Assembly website
The Holmes Center

|-

 
|-

 
|-

 

1929 births
2009 deaths
People from Mount Airy, North Carolina
Republican Party members of the North Carolina House of Representatives
Appalachian State Mountaineers football players
People from Yadkin County, North Carolina
Players of American football from North Carolina
20th-century American politicians
21st-century American politicians